George B. Buxton was a two-term Republican mayor of Norwalk, Connecticut, United States from 1901 to 1902 and from 1904 to 1905.

He visited Cuba, and later resided in Orange, New Jersey.

Associations 
 Member, St. John's Number 6 Masonic Lodge; Master Mason (1898)
 Member, The Norwalk Club

References 

1866 births
Connecticut Republicans
Mayors of Norwalk, Connecticut
Year of death missing